Ha Gorge is a narrow gorge, at the Monasteraki Dakos, on the eastern part of the island of Crete in Greece. It is located in the west slope of Thrypti mountain range, and exits east
of Vasiliki village in the plain of Ierapetra. From this location scenic views overlook Pahia Amos and the bay. Being practically inaccessible to people, the gorge maintains a rich and diverse flora and fauna. Late Minoan IIIC sites are in the area.

Etymology
The name 'Ha Gorge' is derived from the Greek Cretan dialect hasko meaning "separate" or "to gape".

Location

The gorge is located on the north end of the Isthmus of Hierapetra. Access to the geological fault is very difficult. The road approach to the gorge is  along the national highway from Iraklio to Agios Nikolaos and then the approach leads through Ierapetra and the village of Episkopi. From this village, a diversion road over a distance of  leads to the Thripti, a location of a church. From this location access to the gorge is only by walking.

Features
The gorge splits "at right angles a fault-cliff which divides east Crete". It has a number of falls along its length out of which a fall of 250 m is the steepest.

The geological formations created by this wide fault exposes the rock-beds and their folds which are identical on both banks of the gorge. Geologically it is interpreted as a "r Tectonics" active normal fault, known as the Ierapetra active fault with a northeast–southwest orientation.

The stream emerging from the gorge is diverted to drive two watermills.

Archeological excavations
Archeological excavations in the vicinity of have revealed Late Neolithic-Final Neolithic (4000 BC -3000BC) occupation on the Monastiraki Katalimata, which is precariously located at the edge of Ha Gorge. Monasteraki Halasmenos is nearby. Halasmenos, a Late Minoan IIIC site, lies on a hill near the end of the gorge's mouth, and with Kavousi and Vasiliki-Kephala, it forms a triad of important sites from this period. A number of ruins and artifacts have been unearthed on the northern bank of the Ha gorge, with some of the ruins perched on the individual narrow rock shelves near vertical face of the cliff. Apart from archaeologists, a few adventure seeking rock climbers are seen in the area, which otherwise is almost inaccessible.

Wildlife
Smyrnium, a genus of flowering plants in the family Apiaceae, the umbellifers found in Crete is also found in the inaccessible Ha gorge; there are three species of this plant. The gorge is home to many migratory and endemic birds, mammals, reptiles and insects.

References

Bibliography

External links

Gorges of Crete
Landforms of Lasithi